is a Kofun period burial mound located in the town of Mibu, Shimotsuga District, Tochigi Prefecture in the northern Kantō region of Japan. It received protection as a National Historic Site in 1926.

Overview
It is located on the west bank of the Kurokawa River, in the northeast of the town center of Mibu Town, and is part of a group of tumuli, which include the nearby Kurumazuka Kofun and Ushizuka Kofun, which have different shapes, and which have separate National Historic Site designations. The tumulus is constructed in two tiers and has a total length of 77 meters for the bottom tier and 53 meters for the upper tier. This construction is typical of kofun in this region and period for the rectangular portion to be larger and taller than the circular portion. The tumulus was surrounded by a moat with a width of over twenty meters, portions of which survive. 

Overall length 77 meters
Posterior circular portion 23 meter diameter x 5.5 meter high, 2-tier
Anterior rectangular portion 35 meters wide x 6 meter high, 2-tier

The tumulus has never been excavated and details of the burial chamber are unknown, but from the design of the tumulus and from fragments of haniwa (including one of a man in armor) and Sue ware pottery which have been recovered from the vicinity, it is estimated to date from the mid-6th century AD. This was a period of transition between the Kofun period when the Shimotsuke area was ruled by independent local kings and the Asuka period, when the centralized Yamato state dominated. Its size, and location near other large tumuli and the site of the Shimotsuke Kokubun-ji indicate the importance of this region in Kofun period Shimotsuke. 

The top of the tumulus is occupied by a Shinto shrine (the Atago Shrine) from which the kofun gets its name. This shrine was built in 1694 by Matsudaira Terusada, daimyō of Mibu Domain, as it was located in the Kimon, or "unlucky direction" from Mibu Castle. 

The Atagoyama Kofun is about a 15 minute walk from Mibu Station on the Tōbu Railway Tōbu Utsunomiya Line.

See also

List of Historic Sites of Japan (Tochigi)

References

External links
 Tochigi Tourist Information 
Mibu Department of Education

Kofun
History of Tochigi Prefecture
Mibu, Tochigi
Historic Sites of Japan
Shimotsuke Province